Ryan Dinwiddie (born November 27, 1980) is the head coach of the Toronto Argonauts and is a former professional Canadian football quarterback. After playing college football, he went undrafted and signed with the Chicago Bears, however he was cut from their training camp.  Dinwiddie later went on to play professionally for the Hamburg Sea Devils of NFL Europe, and also played for the Winnipeg Blue Bombers and the Saskatchewan Roughriders of the Canadian Football League.

College career
Dinwiddie graduated from Elk Grove High School in Elk Grove, California. He was three-year starter at Boise State from 2001 to 2003, and one of the most prolific passers in college football history. In 2003, he passed for 4,031 yards, 28 touchdowns, and only 5 interceptions. Dinwiddie's record NCAA Division I Football Bowl Subdivision (formerly Division I-A) for career passing efficiency with a mark of 168.9 was broken in 2007 by Colt Brennan's career 169.25.

Dinwiddie is considered, by some, to be the greatest quarterback in the history of Boise State football. Though many of his records and accomplishments went on to be surpassed by Kellen Moore. His leadership and on-field performance was one of the reasons for the continued success of Boise State football during his tenure.

Professional career

Winnipeg Blue Bombers
After an injury to Winnipeg Blue Bombers starting quarterback Kevin Glenn in the 4th quarter of the CFL East Division Final on November 18, 2007, Dinwiddie was pressed into action. He made his first CFL start for the Blue Bombers against the Saskatchewan Roughriders in the 2007 Grey Cup, won by Saskatchewan 23 to 19.  Dinwiddie gave up 3 interceptions to James Johnson.

Making just his second career CFL start (and first career CFL regular season start) on July 24, 2008, Dinwiddie moved the ball, avoided sacks and kept plays alive. He finished 24 of 39 for 450 yards and one touchdown with no interceptions.  Dinwiddie also ran for 26 yards on six carries to lead the Blue Bombers to their first win of the season.

Dinwiddie's success was short-lived with the Blue Bombers, however.  During his 3 years as a backup in Winnipeg, his career CFL statistics are 58.2% completion percentage, for 1,581 yards, 6 Touchdowns and 9 Interceptions, for a Passer Rating of 73.8.  He also rushed the ball 23 times for 112 yards, 1 Touchdown, and 2 Fumbles.

Dinwiddie was released at the beginning of the Blue Bombers 2009 training camp.

Saskatchewan Roughriders
On May 26, 2010 it was announced that Dinwiddie had signed a contract with the Saskatchewan Roughriders. After serving as the back-up to Darian Durant for two years, Dinwiddie was released on January 19, 2012. He retired as a player shortly thereafter.

Coaching career

Montreal Alouettes
On February 19, 2013, it was announced that Dinwiddie was joining the coaching staff of the Montreal Alouettes newly hired head coach, Dan Hawkins, as the offensive quality control coach.

Calgary Stampeders
On December 8, 2015, Dinwiddie was hired by the Calgary Stampeders as the team's QB coach. Under Dinwiddie, Bo Levi Mitchell won CFL Most Outstanding Player twice as the Stampeders reached the Grey Cup in three consecutive years, including winning in 2018.

Toronto Argonauts
On December 12, 2019, Dinwiddie was named the head coach of the Toronto Argonauts, the 45th in team history. However, the 2020 CFL season was cancelled and he did not coach in 2020. In his first season, in 2021, he led the team to a first place finish in the East Division, but the club lost the East Final to the Hamilton Tiger-Cats.

In 2022, after a 4–5 start to the season, Dinwiddie led the team to an 11–7 finish and a second consecutive first place finish in the East Division. He earned his first playoff victory against the Montreal Alouettes in the East Final and coached in his first Grey Cup as a head coach. He led the team to the 18th championship in franchise history after the team defeated the Winnipeg Blue Bombers in the 109th Grey Cup game.

CFL Coaching Record

References

1980 births
Living people
American football quarterbacks
Boise State Broncos football players
Canadian football quarterbacks
Chicago Bears players
Hamburg Sea Devils players
Sportspeople from Elk Grove, California
Saskatchewan Roughriders players
Winnipeg Blue Bombers players
Players of American football from California
American players of Canadian football
Montreal Alouettes coaches
Calgary Stampeders coaches
Toronto Argonauts coaches